Eraković is a surname. Notable people with the surname include:

 Marina Eraković (born 1988), Croatian New Zealander tennis player
 Strahinja Eraković (born 2001), Serbian football player

Croatian surnames
Serbian surnames